Rhabdoblennius nigropunctatus is a species of combtooth blenny found in the western Pacific Ocean, around Fiji and Tonga.  This species reaches a length of  TL. Along with Rhabdoblennius papuensis in 2004 it was the most recently described member of it genus.

References

nigropunctatus
Taxa named by Hans Bath
Fish described in 2004